Hajjiabad (also Romanized as Ḩājjīābād and Hājīābād) is a village in Rostaq Rural District, in the Central District of Saduq County, Yazd Province, Iran. At the 2006 census, its population was 29, in 10 families.

References 

Populated places in Saduq County